Bangor Grammar School (The Grammar or B.G.S.), is a Northern Irish voluntary grammar school for boys in Bangor, County Down. It was founded in 1856 by the Conservative politician Robert Ward and is one of eight Northern Irish schools represented on the Headmasters' and Headmistresses' Conference.

Old boys of the school are known as Grammarians.

History

Endowment for the school came from the will of local gentleman and politician Robert Ward of Castle Ward. Ward was the fourth son of Bernard Ward, 1st Viscount Bangor, and grandson of Michael Ward. Ward bequeathed £1,000 to be "…expended in building and endowing a School-house for the education of boys in Mathematics, Astronomy and Navigation…", in his family home town and parliamentary constituency.

Initially established as Bangor Endowed School, the school was originally situated on the site of the modern day Bank of Ireland building on the corner of Main Street and Central Avenue. By the turn of the 20th century the school had changed its name to Bangor Grammar School and because of a growth in school population moved from site to site over a number of years.  With the help of W.K. Crosby, the school moved to a new site on College Avenue, in the northeast of Bangor in 1906.  The facade visible from College Avenue is a combination of two buildings: Crosby House (known as the Crosby Buildings), which dates back to 1905 and was named after the school's benefactor; and a later extension to the north, which was added as a Headmaster's residence around the time of the outbreak of The Great War (1914–1918).

Despite  Northern Ireland not being subject to conscription like the rest of the United Kingdom, a significant number of Grammarians volunteered for the British Armed Forces and fought in both World Wars, in particular the Second World War (1939–1945). The school population was comparatively small at this time, reaching just 200 pupils in 1930 as opposed to 936 pupils in 2008.

Two commemorative plaques are erected in the school assembly hall listing the names off all ex-pupils that died whilst serving in the British Armed Forces during both World Wars. The school's Debating Society minutes present a record of motions brought to the house concerning key events of the times, including a motion concerning the Munich Agreement."

Clubs and societies

Sport

Bangor Grammar has won the rugby Ulster Schools Cup on five occasions and has appeared in nine finals. The school is therefore ranked as seventh in terms of overall success in the competition.  The late 1980s saw a particularly successful period for the school, appearing in four finals from 1985 to 1988 and winning three of them. Bangor Grammar have won the Burney Cup and McCullough Cup and All Ireland schools titles in hockey. In 2005, a badminton double was achieved in the Ulster Finals of the Minors Division 2 and the Seniors Ulster Cup. The Minors beat RBAI in the League Final 4–2 and the Seniors won 4–2. The Seniors were also in the Division 2 final but were beaten by Belfast Royal Academy, a Division 1 team.

Preparatory school
The school had a preparatory school called Connor House for pupils aged 4–11 until the end of the 2011–12 academic year.

Associations with other schools
As is the case for many single-sex schools Bangor Grammar maintains close links with its sister single-sex school in Bangor, Glenlola Collegiate. The two schools regularly participate in joint activities, most notably the Combined Cadet Force, which meets in an MoD-funded, purpose-built site on Bangor Grammar's campus; the two Scripture Union Societies which hold joint meetings and activities; and the two drama departments, which collaborate on student productions.

Notable past pupils

Politics

Leslie Cree – Ulster Unionist Party member of the Northern Ireland Assembly
David Trimble, Baron Trimble – Leader of the Ulster Unionist Party (1995–2005), Northern Ireland's First Minister (1999–2000 and 2000–2002) and Nobel Peace Prize winner in 1998. Attended the school from 1956 to 1963
Peter Weir, Baron Weir of Ballyholme – Democratic Unionist Party member of the House of Lords (2022–present), member of the Northern Ireland Assembly (2017–2022)
Brian Wilson – Green Party member of the Northern Ireland Assembly

Media and society

Colin Bateman – Author and screenwriter, creator of Murphy's Law
Jason Barlow – TV presenter
Wilfrid Merydith Capper  – Countryside campaigner
Peter Millar (journalist)
Mark Hamilton – BBC and RTÉ TV and radio doctor
Adam Best – Television actor, Matt Parker in the BBC TV drama Holby City

Music
Iain Archer – Singer/songwriter and winner of an Ivor Novello Award
Brian Irvine - Composer
Alex Trimble, Kevin Baird, and Sam Halliday - of indie rock band Two Door Cinema Club
Sean Walsh, Sean Arkins and Robert Burch - of pop band The Original Rudeboys

Sport
Former Bangor Grammar students have represented Northern Ireland, Ireland, Great Britain and Europe at international level in a number of sports.

Rugby union
 British and Irish Lions
 Richard Milliken
 

 Ireland A
 Bryn Cunningham
 Paul McKenzie

 Ulster A
 Stuart McCloskey
 Aaron Sexton

Cricket

 John Elder
 Mark Hutchinson
 Brian Millar
 Michael Rea

Association football

 Keith Gillespie 
 Terry Neill

Field hockey

 Chris Cargo
 Stephen Martin
 David McManus

 Stephen Martin

Olympians
 Ireland
 Chris Cargo; field hockey – 2016
 Davey Gray; rowing – 1980
 Stephen Milne; sailing – 2008
 Bill O'Hara; sailing – 1984, 1988
 Conrad Simpson; sailing – 1988, 1992

 Great Britain
 Stephen Martin; field hockey – 1984, 1988 and 1992. Gold medallist in 1988.

Golf
 David Feherty; represented Ireland in Dunhill Cup and World Cup tournaments and Europe at the  1991 Ryder Cup

Arms

References

External links
Bangor Grammar School Website
Bangor Grammarians
 Bangor Grammar School short film: final dinner, final days at College Avenue 1905-2012 

Grammar schools in County Down
Member schools of the Headmasters' and Headmistresses' Conference
Bangor, County Down
Boys' schools in Northern Ireland